Sarigua National Park (Parque Nacional Sarigua) is a national park situated on the Azuero Peninsula in the Herrera Province of Panama, approximately  from Panama City. 

The park consists of an ancient archaeological site and was once a dry tropical rainforest. As a result of deforestation, it is now a desert.

References 

Herrera Province